School bus yellow is a color that was specifically formulated for use on school buses in North America in 1939. Originally officially named National School Bus Chrome, the color is now officially known in Canada and the U.S. as National School Bus Glossy Yellow. For many years, the pigment for this color was chrome yellow, which contains lead.

Origin
In April 1939, Dr. Frank W. Cyr, a professor at Teachers College, Columbia University in New York organized a conference that established 44 uniform national design, construction, and safety standards for school buses in America, including the exterior body color. The yellow-orange color was selected because black lettering on it was most legible in semi-darkness, and because it was conspicuous at a distance and unusual enough to become associated with school buses and groups of children en route.

Transportation officials from each of the then-48 states; representatives from bus chassis and body manufacturers, and paint experts from DuPont and Pittsburgh Paints participated in the conference, which was funded by a $5,000 grant (over $100,000 today) from the Rockefeller Foundation. The yellow-orange color, in three slight variants to allow for different paint formulations was adopted by the National Bureau of Standards (now the National Institute of Standards and Technology) as Federal Standard No. 595a, Color 13432.

Dr. Cyr became known as the "Father of the Yellow School Bus."

Outside North America
North American-style yellow school buses are being introduced in some parts of the United Kingdom, prompted by corporate links to the American industry, for example First Student UK, or a desire to re-brand school buses, such as West Yorkshire Metro's Mybus.

A similar shade of yellow was used in Santiago, Chile's bus lines between 1992 and 2007.

Examples

See also

 School bus (main article)
 New York City taxi color regulations
 Fire engine red
 International orange
 Safety orange
 List of colors

References

External links
 Highway Safety Program Guidelines archived from the National Highway Traffic Safety Administration.
 100 Years of the School Bus archived from STN.

School buses
Standards of the United States
Shades of yellow
1939 introductions